Flying Frogs is an Indian film production company.

Film production

References 

Film production companies based in Chennai
Entertainment companies of India
Companies with year of establishment missing